Kattalai is a village Tirunelveli district in the Indian state of Tamil Nadu. It is located on north east side of Tirunelveli at the confluence of the Thamiraparani River with the Thamiraparani river.

Villages in Tirunelveli district